John Lancelot Cowan (14 August 1893 – 19 May 1971) served as one of the 4 members for the District of Southern Districts in the South Australian Legislative Council from 26 May 1949 to 28 February 1959.

Early life 
Cowan who was born in Murray Bridge, South Australia, was the eldest son of John Cowan, a pastoralist and parliamentarian, and his wife Elizabeth, née Jones. He was educated at Prince Alfred College and served in the First Australian Imperial Force. In 1920, Cowan married Florence Yates.

Political career 
Cowan served as a councillor on the District Council of Mobilong from 1927 to 1949, and was chairman of the council from 1932 to 1949.  He also served as the President of the Local Government Association of South Australia.  In 1944, he unsuccessfully contested the House of Assembly seat of Murray.  Cowan was elected unopposed to the Legislative Council on 26 May 1949, and retired during his second term on 28 February 1959.

References

Further reading 
 

Members of the South Australian Legislative Council
Mayors of places in South Australia
1893 births
1971 deaths
People educated at Prince Alfred College
Liberal and Country League politicians
People from Murray Bridge, South Australia
20th-century Australian politicians
Politicians from Adelaide
Australian people of Northern Ireland descent